Slim Fingers is a 1929 American crime film directed by Joseph Levigard and written by William Berke and Carl Krusada. The film stars Bill Cody, Duane Thompson, Wilbur Mack, Monte Montague, Arthur Morrison and Charles King. The film was released on March 24, 1929, by Universal Pictures.

Cast        
Bill Cody as Al Wellsley
Duane Thompson as Kate
Wilbur Mack as Dan Donovan
Monte Montague as Valet
Arthur Morrison as Riley
Charles King as Morgan

References

External links
 

1929 films
American crime films
1929 crime films
Universal Pictures films
American silent feature films
American black-and-white films
1920s English-language films
1920s American films
Silent crime films